The men's triple jump at the 1962 British Empire and Commonwealth Games as part of the athletics programme was held at the Perry Lakes Stadium on Thursday 29 November 1962.

Wales' Lynn Davies who had finished fourth in the long jump failed to record a single legal jump.

Records

The following records were established during the competition:

Final

References

Men's triple jump
1962